Buckingham is an unincorporated community in Buckingham Township in Bucks County, Pennsylvania, United States. Buckingham is located at the intersection of U.S. Route 202, Pennsylvania Route 263, and Pennsylvania Route 413.

References

Unincorporated communities in Bucks County, Pennsylvania
Unincorporated communities in Pennsylvania